The 2016–17 Pacific Tigers women's basketball team will represent the University of the Pacific during the 2016–17 NCAA Division I women's basketball season. The Tigers are led by second year head coach Bradley Davis. They play their home games at Alex G. Spanos Center and were members of the West Coast Conference. They play their home games at Alex G. Spanos Center and were members of the West Coast Conference. They finished the season 10–21, 5–13 in WCC play to finish in a tie for eighth place. They advanced to the quarterfinals of the WCC women's tournament where they lost to Gonzaga.

Roster

Schedule 

|-
!colspan=9 style="background:#FF7F00; color:#000000;"| Exhibition

|-
!colspan=9 style="background:#FF7F00; color:#000000;"| Non-conference regular season

|-
!colspan=9 style="background:#FF7F00; color:#000000;"| WCC regular season

|-
!colspan=9 style="background:#FF7F00;"| WCC Women's Tournament

Rankings

See also 
2016–17 Pacific Tigers men's basketball team

References 

Pacific Tigers women's basketball seasons
Pacific
Pacific
Pacific